The 2019 Birmingham Classic (also known as the Nature Valley Classic for sponsorship reasons) was a women's tennis tournament played on outdoor grass courts. It was the 38th edition of the event, and a Premier tournament on the 2019 WTA Tour. It took place at the Edgbaston Priory Club in Birmingham, United Kingdom, on 17–23 June 2019.

Points and prize money

Point distribution

Prize money 

1Qualifiers prize money is also the round of 32 prize money.
*per team

Singles main draw entrants

Seeds 

1 Rankings as of June 10, 2019.

Other entrants 
The following players received wildcards into the main draw:
  Harriet Dart
  Karolína Plíšková
  Heather Watson 
  Venus Williams

The following players received entry from the qualifying draw:
  Lauren Davis 
  Kristýna Plíšková 
  Iga Świątek 
  Viktoriya Tomova

Withdrawals 
Before the tournament
  Bianca Andreescu → replaced by  Yulia Putintseva
  Danielle Collins → replaced by  Jennifer Brady
  Camila Giorgi → replaced by  Evgeniya Rodina
  Madison Keys → replaced by  Barbora Strýcová
  Petra Kvitová → replaced by  Ekaterina Alexandrova
  Garbiñe Muguruza → replaced by  Johanna Konta
  Anastasia Pavlyuchenkova → replaced by  Margarita Gasparyan
  Carla Suárez Navarro → replaced by  Kristina Mladenovic

Doubles main draw entrants

Seeds 

1 Rankings as of June 10, 2019.

Other entrants 
The following pair received a wildcard into the doubles main draw:
  Harriet Dart /  Venus Williams
  Sarah Beth Grey /  Eden Silva

Withdrawals 
During the tournament
  Ashleigh Barty (right arm injury)

Retirements 
  Lyudmyla Kichenok (right shoulder injury)

Champions

Singles

  Ashleigh Barty def.  Julia Görges, 6–3, 7–5

Doubles

 Hsieh Su-wei /  Barbora Strýcová def.  Anna-Lena Grönefeld /  Demi Schuurs, 6–4, 6–7(4–7), [10–
8]

References

External links 
 

2019 WTA Tour
2019
2019 in English tennis
Birmingham Classic